Mesake Doge (born 1 April 1993) is a Fijian rugby union player, currently playing for Pro14 side Dragons. His preferred position is prop.

Professional career
Doge represented Rugby Timișoara during the 2018–19 European Rugby Challenge Cup. He joined Brive in 2019, making 24 appearances over two seasons. In July 2021, he joined . Doge plays internationally for the Fiji national rugby union team, having made his debut in 2016. He won two further caps against New Zealand in 2021.

References

External links
 

1993 births
Living people
People from Nadroga-Navosa Province
Fijian rugby union players
Fiji international rugby union players
Dragons RFC players
CA Brive players
Rugby union props
SCM Rugby Timișoara players
Fijian Drua players